Urotrygonidae is a family of rays in the order Myliobatiformes, commonly referred to as the American round stingrays or round rays.  They are native to the tropical and warm temperate marine waters of the Americas.  The two genera in this family were formerly placed within the family Urolophidae, whose species are now restricted to the Indo-Pacific.  They have a round pectoral fin disk, a slender tail with a caudal fin, no dorsal fins, and a venomous tail spine.

References

 
Myliobatiformes
Ray families